Chavdar Ivaylov (Bulgarian: Чавдар Ивайлов; born 9 July 1996) is a Bulgarian professional footballer who plays as a midfielder for Botev Vratsa.

Career

Litex Lovech
Ivaylov began his football career  from Litex Lovech Academy. In 2015 he was promoted to Litex Lovech II. He made his debut for the team on 26 July 2016 in match against Dobrudzha Dobrich. A month later he scored his first goal for the club against Spartak Pleven.

Etar Veliko Tarnovo
In July 2016 Ivaylov moved to the newly promoted to Bulgarian Second League team of Etar Veliko Tarnovo. He made his debut for the team in the league on 6 August 2016 in match against PFC Bansko. The team won the league and promoted to First Professional Football League in the end of the season.

Ivaylov completed his professional debut on 14 July 2017 in the debut league match of the team against Lokomotiv Plovdiv.

Botev Vratsa
In January 2020, he joined  Botev Vratsa.

International career

Youth levels
Ivaylov was called up for the Bulgaria U21 team on 14 March 2017.

Career statistics

Club

References

External links
 

1996 births
Living people
People from Teteven
Bulgarian footballers
Bulgaria youth international footballers
Bulgaria under-21 international footballers
Association football midfielders
PFC Litex Lovech players
SFC Etar Veliko Tarnovo players
FC CSKA 1948 Sofia players
FC Botev Vratsa players
First Professional Football League (Bulgaria) players
Second Professional Football League (Bulgaria) players